Zaki al-Khatib (1887–1961) was a Syrian politician from the People's Party who served as Prime Minister of Syria.

Political career 
He was Minister of Justice from September 1941 to April 1942.

References 

1887 births

1961 deaths
Prime Ministers of Syria
20th-century Syrian politicians
Syrian ministers of justice
20th-century Syrian lawyers
Arabs from the Ottoman Empire
Politicians from Damascus